Andrés Guillermo Gudiño Portillo (born 27 January 1997) is a Mexican professional footballer who plays as a goalkeeper for Liga MX club Cruz Azul.

Career statistics

Club

Honours
Cruz Azul
Liga MX: Guardianes 2021
Campeón de Campeones: 2021
Supercopa de la Liga MX: 2022

References

External links
 
 
 

Living people
1997 births
Ascenso MX players
Association football goalkeepers
Cruz Azul footballers
Cruz Azul Hidalgo footballers
Liga MX players
Venados F.C. players
Footballers from Yucatán
Sportspeople from Mérida, Yucatán
Mexican footballers